Daniel Paluska is an American artist and roboticist known for his computer art installations and collaborations. Paluska is originally from Michigan,. He received both his BS and master's degrees in Mechanical Engineering from MIT where he worked on robotic legs. His work on walking robotics was featured in a cover article of Wired Magazine in September, 2000. Paluska is currently the VP of Robotics at The Pickle Robot Company, a startup he co-founded in 2018.

Paluska created the Absolut Quartet, an interactive music-making machine created with Jeff Lieberman and commissioned by Absolut Vodka. He also collaborated with Amorphic Robotics in 2006 to create the ToteMobile, a transformational sculpture inspired and commissioned by Citroen. Paluska is the proprietor of Brooklyn Mobile, a mobile internet videotelephony booth.

External links 

 Absolut Machines Demo Video
 Absolut Machines Homepage (Archived from the original)

References

Year of birth missing (living people)
Living people
American artists
Artists from Michigan
American roboticists
MIT School of Engineering alumni